is a Japanese footballer who plays for Nara Club.

Club statistics
Updated to 23 February 2020.

References

External links

Profile at SC Sagamihara

1992 births
Living people
Association football people from Kanagawa Prefecture
Japanese footballers
J3 League players
Japan Football League players
SC Sagamihara players
Tokyo Musashino United FC players
Nara Club players
Association football goalkeepers